OJSC AMO ZiL, known fully as the Public Joint-Stock Company – Likhachov Plant and more commonly called ZiL (was a major Russian automobile, truck, military vehicle, and heavy equipment manufacturer that was based in Moscow, Russia.

The last ZiL vehicle was assembled in 2012. The company continues to exist only as real-estate development site, on which a new urban district will be built by the LSR Group construction company.

History

The factory was founded on 2 August 1916 as the Moscow Automotive Society or AMO. The factory was completed in 1917, just before the Revolution, and was built south of Moscow near Moscow River in Tjufeleva grove. It was a modern building with the latest in American equipment and was designed to employ 6,000 workers. The plans were to produce Fiat F-15 1.5-ton trucks under license. Because of the October Revolution and the subsequent Russian Civil War, it took until 1 November 1924 to produce the first vehicle which was shown at a parade on 7 November, the AMO-F-15. Nevertheless, the factory still managed to assemble trucks bought from Italy in 1917–1919. On April 30, 1923 the factory was named after an Italian communist Pietro Ferrero, but in 1925 was renamed to First National Automobile Factory (Russian: 1-й Государственный автомобильный завод). 2 years later in 1927 Ivan Likhachov was appointed as a head of the factory, a person whose name the factory bears from 1956. In April 1929, it was agreed on to expand the plant to build Autocar 2.5-ton truck models.

In 1929—1931, the factory was re-equipped and expanded with the help of the American A.J. Brandt Co., and changed its name to Automotive Factory No. 2 Zavod Imeni Stalina (ZIS or ZiS). After Nikita Khrushchev denounced the cult of personality of Joseph Stalin in 1956, the name was changed again to Zavod imeni Likhachyova, after its former director Ivan Alekseevich Likhachov.

ZiL lanes—road lanes dedicated to vehicles carrying top Soviet officials—were named after the car. The ZiL limousines were the official car that carried the Soviet heads of state, and many Soviet Union allied leaders, to summits or in parades. The limousines were flown to international summits as, for example, in 1987 and 1990 to Washington, D.C. for President Mikhail Gorbachev's official state visits.

ZiL had a history of exporting trucks to Cuba, a trade resumed in the early 21st century. The ZiL factory is portrayed in a 2014 documentary, The Last Limousine.

After the final ZiL limousine was built in 2012, the Moscow factory administration stopped truck production and the company was declared bankrupt in 2013. ZiL still exists as a legal entity, but produces no vehicles. In 2014 it was announced that the factory site will be turned into a residential development. Most factory buildings were dismantled in 2015.

The factory's equipment and other automotive assets were auctioned off to a new company, "MSTs6 AMO ZIL". It employs 47 staff, mostly former ZiL workers. The company took part in the Moscow International Automobile Salon 2016.

After the building of "MSTs6 AMO ZIL" was demolished in 2020, it was believed that the company ceased to exist. However, it was reported in 2021 that MSTs6 continued to operate. Its staff and equipment were moved to the Moscow Oblast.

Awards
 In June 1942 the VMS was awarded the first Order of Lenin for the excellent organization of the production of ammunition and weapons.
 In October 1944 the plant was awarded the Order of Red Banner of Labour.
 In 1971 the plant was awarded the Order of Lenin for the third successful implementation of the Eighth Five-Year Plan.
 In 1975 the plant was awarded the Order of the October Revolution for the successful completion of works on creation of capacities up to 200 thousand cars per year issuance.

See also
 List of ZiL vehicles
 Soviet Artillery Factory No. 92 — also named Zavod imeni Stalina (ZiS).
 GM "old-look" transit bus: Soviet versions — ZiS-154 and ZiS-155 models.

References

Literature

External links

 —Official MSTS6 ZIL website
 —Official ZiL website
 From Soviet Russia With Love - article about presidential limousines made by the company

 
Bus manufacturers of Russia
Luxury motor vehicle manufacturers
Vehicle manufacturing companies established in 1916
1916 establishments in the Russian Empire
Russian brands
Soviet brands
Companies listed on the Moscow Exchange
De-Stalinization
Car manufacturers of Russia